Cheongwusan is a mountain in Gyeonggi-do, South Korea. It can be found in the county of Gapyeong.

See also
List of mountains in Korea

Notes

References

Mountains of South Korea
Mountains of Gyeonggi Province

zh:青雨山